Chingford War Memorial is a Grade II listed war memorial cross at the junction of King's Head Hill and The Ridgeway, Chingford, London, E4.

It was unveiled in 1921, and was designed by W. A. Lewis.

See also
 List of public art in Waltham Forest

References

External links

Grade II listed buildings in the London Borough of Waltham Forest
Celtic crosses
Memorial crosses
Stone crosses in the United Kingdom
World War I memorials in England
World War II memorials in England
Grade II listed monuments and memorials
Military memorials in London
Chingford